Zoltán Almási (born August 29, 1976) is a Hungarian chess player. Awarded the title Grandmaster by FIDE in 1993, he is a nine-time Hungarian champion, winning in 1995, 1997, 1999, 2000, 2003, 2006, 2008, 2009, and 2019.

Almási has competed in 13 consecutive Chess Olympiads from 1994 to 2018 earning team silver in 2002 and 2014 as well as individual silver in 2010 (on board two) and 2016 (on board three).

In the FIDE World Chess Championship 2004, he made it to the fourth round where he lost 2–0 to Rustam Kasimdzhanov, the eventual winner of the event.

In 2008 he won the Reggio Emilia tournament in Italy scoring 5½/8 points.

He crossed the 2700 FIDE rating line in November 2009 (2704).

In 2010, he won the European Rapid Chess Championship. He tied with five other players after 13 rounds and won tiebreak matches against Shirov and Gashimov. The next year he won the Sport Accord Mindgames Blindfold section.

In 2013, Almási won the Capablanca Memorial scoring 6½/10 points.

References

External links
 
 
 
 
 

1976 births
Living people
Chess grandmasters
Chess Olympiad competitors
Hungarian chess players
World Youth Chess Champions
Place of birth missing (living people)